Michael Timothy "Bueno" Good is a retired NASA astronaut, engineer and retired commissioned officer in the United States Air Force, holding the rank of Colonel. Mike Good flew aboard Space Shuttle Atlantis for its STS-125 mission. STS-125 was the final Hubble Space Telescope servicing mission. Good flew as mission specialist 2 to the International Space Station on STS-132.

Early life
Good was born in Parma, Ohio, but was raised in Broadview Heights.

Good went to college and received a Bachelor of Science in aerospace engineering at the University of Notre Dame, before completing a Master of Science program there in 1986.

He is married to the former Joan Dickinson also of Broadview Heights. They have three children Bryan, Jason and Shannon and two grandchildren Gavin and Braxton.

Good graduated from Brecksville-Broadview Heights High School of Broadview Heights, Ohio, in 1980.
He earned a B.S. in Aerospace Engineering from the University of Notre Dame in 1984,
and an M.S. in Aerospace Engineering from the University of Notre Dame in 1986.

Military career
After graduation, he was commissioned a second lieutenant in the United States Air Force and subsequently assigned to Eglin Air Force Base. As an aviator, he has flown more than 30 types of aircraft, including the F-111, B-2 Stealth Bomber and the F-15. He has logged more than  hours of flight. Good was selected and began training as a mission specialist by NASA in 2000. He is one of only two Air Force rated navigators who have been selected as astronauts (the other being Richard Mullane, selected in 1978). Both of these navigators were weapon systems officers.

Awards and honors
Distinguished Graduate from the University of Notre Dame, Reserve Officer Training Corps, 1984; Lead-in Fighter Training, 1989; Squadron Officer School, 1993. Top Academic Graduate of Specialized Undergraduate Navigator Training, 1989; F-111 Replacement Training Unit, 1989; USAF Test Pilot School, 1994. Aircrew of the Year, 77th Fighter Squadron, 1991. Military decorations include the Legion of Merit, Meritorious Service Medal (4), Aerial Achievement Medal (2), Air Force Commendation Medal, Air Force Achievement Medal, Combat Readiness Medal and various other service awards.

He retired from NASA on May 31, 2019.

References

External links
 
 Spacefacts biography of Michael T. Good

1962 births
Living people
People from Parma, Ohio
Military personnel from Ohio
Notre Dame College of Engineering alumni
American aerospace engineers
United States Air Force officers
U.S. Air Force Test Pilot School alumni
United States Air Force astronauts
NASA civilian astronauts
People from Broadview Heights, Ohio
Engineers from Ohio
Space Shuttle program astronauts
Spacewalkers